Peter Jamvold (24 November 1899 – 2 May 1961) was a Norwegian sailor who competed in the 1920 Summer Olympics. He was a crew member of the Norwegian boat Eleda, which won the gold medal in the 10 metre class (1907 rating).

References

External links
profile

1899 births
1961 deaths
Norwegian male sailors (sport)
Sailors at the 1920 Summer Olympics – 10 Metre
Olympic sailors of Norway
Olympic gold medalists for Norway
Olympic medalists in sailing
Medalists at the 1920 Summer Olympics